Roger Mander D.D. (died  21 December 1704) was an English academic administrator at the University of Oxford.

Mander was elected Master (head) of Balliol College, Oxford on 23 October 1687, a post he held until his death in 1704.
During his time as Master of Balliol, he was also Vice-Chancellor of Oxford University from 1700 until 1702.

References

Year of birth missing
1704 deaths
Masters of Balliol College, Oxford
Vice-Chancellors of the University of Oxford